James Lawrence McDermott (25 May 1932 – 29 August 2006) was an English professional footballer who played as a winger.

Career
Born in Earlestown, McDermott made 157 appearances in the Football League for Southport. He also played in the Lancashire Combination for Cromptons Recreation and Wigan Athletic, scoring twice for the latter in 38 games.

McDermott died in Whiston.

References

1932 births
2006 deaths
English footballers
Southport F.C. players
Wigan Athletic F.C. players
English Football League players
Association football midfielders